How Much for Freedom? is the forth full lenght studio album released by the Serbian hardcore/reggae band Eyesburn.

Track listing 
 "Higher Region"
 "Injustice"
 "Soul Reaches to the Sun"
 "Terrorvision"
 "In War with the System"
 "Life"
 "So Much Trouble in the World" (Music By, Lyrics By – Bob Marley)
 "The More U Tell Dem"
 "Eyes Are the Lights"
 "Like Tomorrow Never Come"
 "See You There"
 "Power of Mind"

References 
 How Much for Freedom? at Discogs

Eyesburn albums
2005 albums
PGP-RTS albums